Richard William Beals (28 May 1938, Erie, Pennsylvania) is an American mathematician who works on partial differential equations and functional analysis. He is known as the author or co-author of several mathematical textbooks.

Beals studied at Yale University earning a B.A. in 1960, an M.A. in 1962, and a Ph.D. in 1964 under Felix Browder with thesis Non-Local Boundary Value Problems for Elliptic Partial Differential Operators. In the academic year 1965/1966 he was a visiting assistant professor at the University of Chicago, where he became in 1966 an assistant professor and later a professor. In 1977 he became a professor at Yale University.

Beals works on inverse problems in scattering theory, integrable systems, pseudodifferential operators, complex analysis, global analysis and transport theory. He has been married since 1962 and has three children.

He should not be confused with the mathematics professor at Rutgers University named R. Michael Beals (born in 1954), who is Richard Beals's brother.

Works 
 

 Advanced mathematical analysis; periodic functions and distributions, complex analysis, Laplace transform and applications, Springer Verlag 1973; 2013 pbk edition
 with M. Salah Baouendi and Linda Preiss Rothschild (eds.) Microlocal Analysis, American Mathematical Society 1984
 with Roderick Wong: Special functions: a graduate text, Cambridge University Press 2010
 (Revised with 4 new chapters.)
 Topics in Operator Theory, University of Chicago Press 1971
 2015 pbk edition

References

External links 
 Homepage

20th-century American mathematicians
21st-century American mathematicians
People from Erie, Pennsylvania
University of Chicago faculty
Yale University faculty
Yale College alumni
1938 births
Living people
Mathematicians from Pennsylvania
PDE theorists
Yale Graduate School of Arts and Sciences alumni